
Gmina Wschowa is an urban-rural gmina (administrative district) in Wschowa County, Lubusz Voivodeship, in western Poland.

The gmina contains part of the protected area called Przemęt Landscape Park.

Villages
Apart from the town of Wschowa, Gmina Wschowa contains the villages and settlements of Buczyna, Czerlejewo, Dębowa Łęka, Hetmanice, Kandlewo, Klucz, Konradowo, Łęgoń, Lgiń, Łysiny, Mały Bór, Nowa Wieś, Olbrachcice, Osowa Sień, Przyczyna Dolna, Przyczyna Górna, Pszczółkowo, Siedlnica, Tylewice, Wincentowo and Wygnańczyce.

Neighbouring gminas
Gmina Wschowa is bordered by the gminas of Niechlów, Sława, Święciechowa, Szlichtyngowa, Wijewo and Włoszakowice.

Twin towns – sister cities

Gmina Wschowa is twinned with:
 Šalčininkai, Lithuania

References

Wschowa
Wschowa County